Water polo events were contested at the 1993 Summer Universiade in Buffalo, New York, USA.

References
 
 Results of The 17th Universiade '93 Buffalo: Water Polo (universiade.fjct.fit.ac.jp)

1993 Summer Universiade
Universiade
1993
1993